The 2011 Royal LePage OVCA Women's Fall Classic was held from November 3–6 at the North Greenville Curling Club in Kemptville, Ontario as part of the 2011–12 World Curling Tour. The purse for the event was CAD$15,000, and was held in a triple knockout format.

Teams

Knockout results

A event

B event

C event

Playoffs

References

External links

Royal LePage OVCA Women's Fall Classic
Royal LePage OVCA Women's Fall Classic
Royal LePage OVCA Women's Fall Classic
Royal LePage OVCA Women's Fall Classic
Curling in Ontario